Acorn, developed by CACI Limited in London, is a segmentation tool which categorises the United Kingdom’s population into demographic types.  It has been built by analysing significant social factors and population behaviour to provide precise information and improved understanding of the different types of people and communities across the UK. Acorn segments households, postcodes and neighbourhoods into 6 categories, 18 groups and 62 types.

Methodology 
In March 2013 CACI launched the latest version of Acorn, although the necessary data from the 2011 census was not available for the whole of the UK.
Instead, the current version of Acorn was created with a new approach to geodemographics. It does not rely on census data, but takes advantage of the new data environment created by government policies on Open data and the availability of a number of brand new private sector datasets. Peter Sleight, Chair of Association of Census Distributors, considered Acorn's new version a sufficient improvement to have "revolutionised geodemographics". At The Census & Geodemographics Group's decennial conference, Tracking a Decade of Changing Britain, CACI presented a paper on why it had chosen to eschew Census data and how it had gone about developing a new way of creating a demographic segmentation.

Traditionally (since the 1970s), all geodemographic segmentations and classifications were built in broadly the same way. A good example of this is the Output Area Classification (OAC).  The first OAC was developed in 2005 by the University of Leeds in cooperation with the UK Office for National Statistics' (ONS). It is a free and open geodemographic segmentation based on the 2001 UK Census. Currently, at University College London, the OAC is being rebuilt using the 2011 UK Census.

In the traditional approach census and lifestyle data is fed through statistical software to perform a multi-variate segmentation. The resulting segmentation is analysed, named and described.

The most significant aspects of this "traditional" approach are that:

 The same statistical process builds the definition of how to describe communities and allocates local areas (postcode or household) to these types.
 Every local area is classified using the same data variables.
 Every local area is classified using the same statistical algorithm.

The problem with this approach is that housing built after the census cannot be classified primarily because of the requirement to always use the same data and the same algorithm and so, by definition, census data does not and cannot be applied to newly built housing. Furthermore, lifestyle data does not apply either as it takes time to build up a pool of information from new residents. Similarly, data gleaned from things like credit applications can be highly inaccurate if the new housing is a redevelopment of previous housing, since the bulk of information in these traditional data sources can apply to residents of housing that has been demolished. Having developed its own statistical technique to classify such housing, CACI refrained from the traditional method and developed new approaches for postcodes in other circumstances, starting by separating the definition of the types that describe the population from the assignment of postcodes to the types, allowing them to be assigned by use of many different algorithms.

The general principle is to use appropriate data and specific algorithms to give the best segmentation. Examples include age limited housing, newly built social and private housing, manual allocations, student accommodation, etc.

New Data Environment 
This new approach is better suited to the new data environment as increasingly more local information is being published as Open Data and more is available from commercial sources. The first benefit of the new approach is that any future data that becomes available can be incorporated into the segmentation process, thereby bringing about improved updating intended to ‘future-proof’ the solution, since new censuses are not conducted every year. The second benefit is that it is not essential to have data for all of the United Kingdom.  If the Acorn solution can be improved for only part of the country without losing anything elsewhere, then it is clearly advantageous to do so.  With devolved government, a great deal of Open Data is released covering only England, only Scotland, only Wales, etc.  The traditional approach could not use this data since it required the same data for every postcode, but the new approach can.

References

External links
 Acorn
 CACI

Demographics of the United Kingdom
Geodemographic databases
Geographical databases in the United Kingdom
Postcodes in the United Kingdom